This article lists the main target shooting events and their results for 2013.

World Events

International Shooting Sport Federation
 September 16–24: 2013 World Shotgun Championships held in Lima, Peru.

ISSF World Cup
 2013 ISSF World Cup

International Confederation of Fullbore Rifle Associations
 2013 ICFRA F-Class World Championships held at the NRA Whittington Center in Raton, New Mexico, United States.
 F-Open Team winners (Farquharson Trophy): 
 F-TR Team winners (Richardson Cup): 
 F-Open World Champion: , wins Milcun Shield
 F-TR World Champion: , wins Brian Boru Trophy

FITASC
2013 Results.

Island Games
 July 14–19: Shooting at the 2013 Island Games in Bermuda.

Summer Universiade
 July 12–17: Shooting at the 2013 Summer Universiade held in Kazan, Russia.

Regional Events

Africa

Americas

Bolivarian Games
 November 17–23: Shooting at the 2013 Bolivarian Games in Trujillo, Peru.

Asia

Asian Shooting Championships
 October 18–26: 2013 Asian Airgun Championships held at the Azadi Sport Complex in Tehran, Iran.
 October 1–10: 2013 Asian Shotgun Championships in Almaty, Kazakhstan.

Asian Youth Games
 August 18–21: Shooting at the 2013 Asian Youth Games in Nanjing, China.

Southeast Asian Games
 December 11–17: Shooting at the 2013 Southeast Asian Games in Yangon, Myanmar.

Europe

European Shooting Confederation
 February 25 - March 3: 2013 European 10 m Events Championships in Odense, Denmark.
 July 21 - August 4: 2013 European Shooting Championships in Osijek, Croatia.
 July 28 - August 8: 2013 European Shotgun Championships in Suhl, Germany.

Games of the Small States of Europe
 May 28–31: Shooting at the 2013 Games of the Small States of Europe held in Luxembourg.

Mediterranean Games
 June 23–28: Shooting at the 2013 Mediterranean Games in Mersin, Turkey.

"B Matches"
 January 31 - February 2: InterShoot in Den Haag, Netherlands.
 RIAC held in Strassen, Luxembourg.

National Events

United Kingdom

NRA Imperial Meeting
 July, held at the National Shooting Centre, Bisley.
 Queen's Prize winner: 
 Grand Aggregate winner: 
 Ashburton Shield winners: Dollar Academy
 Kolapore Winners: 
 National Trophy Winners: 
 Elcho Shield winners: 
 Vizianagram winners: House of Commons

NSRA National Meeting
 August, held at the National Shooting Centre, Bisley
 Earl Roberts British Prone Champion:

USA
 2013 NCAA Rifle Championships, won by West Virginia Mountaineers.

References

 
2013 in sports